The Chinese Ambassador to Cambodia is the official representative of the People's Republic of China to Cambodia.

List of representatives

See also
 China–Cambodia relations

References 

Ambassadors of China to Cambodia
Cambodia
China